Jordan Antonio Brown (born 10 November 1996) is an English footballer who plays as a forward.

Having started his football career with the Arsenal academy, Brown made his competitive debut for West Ham United in 2015 and his since played in Germany, Czech Republic, Canada and Iceland.

Club career
Having been with Arsenal youth team for eight years, Brown joined West Ham in 2013 as he considered there would be greater opportunities to play football. He was first included in a West Ham matchday squad for their UEFA Europa League first qualifying round second leg fixture away to Lusitanos of Andorra on 9 July 2015, remaining an unused substitute in a 1–0 victory (4–0 aggregate). With manager Slaven Bilić putting priority on the team's Premier League performance, he made an array of changes for their third qualifying round second leg away to FC Astra Giurgiu on 6 August, and Brown made his debut as an 80th-minute substitute for Elliot Lee in a 2–1 defeat which saw his team eliminated. On 9 October 2015, Brown joined Chelmsford City on a one-month loan.

On 2 June 2016, Brown announced he had signed for Hannover 96 via his Instagram social media account. His contract was terminated by mutual consent after 18 months in Germany.

Brown returned to London and signed for Barnet, but following a long wait for international clearance and the departure of Graham Westley as manager, Brown was released by new manager Martin Allen in March 2018.

On 18 October 2018, Brown joined Czech National Football League side Znojmo.

On 30 January 2019, Brown signed for Canadian Premier League side Cavalry FC. In the 2019 Canadian Championship quartfinals, Brown would score the opening goal as Cavalry would upset Major League Soccer side Vancouver Whitecaps, knocking them out of the tournament. In December 2019, Cavalry announced Brown would return to the club for the 2020 season.

On 22 October 2020, Brown signed a one-year contract with Regionalliga side VfR Aalen. He left the club in March 2021 after asking to terminate his contract.

In 2022, he returned to Canada, signing with Electric City FC in League1 Ontario. He led the team in scoring in 2022 with 11 goals.

On 22 August 2022, he returned to the Canadian Premier League, signing with Pacific FC through the 2023 season, with an option for 2024. After the 2022 season, he agreed to mutually terminate the remainder of his contract.

Career statistics

Honours

Club 
Calvary FC 
 Canadian Premier League Finals 
Runners-up: 2019
Canadian Premier League (Regular season): 
Champions: Spring 2019, Fall 2019

References

External links
 
 Electric City stats

1996 births
Living people
Association football forwards
English footballers
Footballers from the London Borough of Brent
Black British sportspeople
English expatriate footballers
Expatriate footballers in Germany
English expatriate sportspeople in Germany
Expatriate footballers in the Czech Republic
English expatriate sportspeople in the Czech Republic
Expatriate soccer players in Canada
English expatriate sportspeople in Canada
Arsenal F.C. players
West Ham United F.C. players
Chelmsford City F.C. players
Hannover 96 II players
Barnet F.C. players
1. SC Znojmo players
Cavalry FC players
VfR Aalen players
National League (English football) players
Regionalliga players
Czech National Football League players
Canadian Premier League players
England youth international footballers
Fylkir players
Úrvalsdeild karla (football) players
Expatriate footballers in Iceland
English expatriate sportspeople in Iceland
Electric City FC players